Between Men is a 1916 American silent Western film directed by and starring William S. Hart. It was produced by the New York Motion Picture Corporation and released through Triangle Film.

The film is preserved in the Library of Congress, George Eastman Museum, and the Museum of Modern Art (MOMA) as well as several European archives.

Cast
 William S. Hart as Bob White
 Enid Markey as Lina Hampdon
 House Peters as Gregg Lewiston
 J. Barney Sherry as Ashley Hampdon
 A. Burt Wesner as John Worth (credited as Bert Wesner)
 Robert McKim as Rankin

References

External links
 
 

1916 films
1916 Western (genre) films
American black-and-white films
Films directed by William S. Hart
Triangle Film Corporation films
Silent American Western (genre) films
1910s American films